Bettina Valeska Lotsch (born 7 September 1977 in Frankenthal (Pfalz)) is a German chemist. She is Director at the Max Planck Institute for Solid State Research in Stuttgart, Germany.

Life 
Lotsch studied chemistry at the Ludwig Maximilian University of Munich and completed it with a diploma in Chemistry in 2000. In 2006, she finished on her dissertation in the group of Wolfgang Schnick at the Ludwig Maximilian University of Munich. From 2007 to 2008, she worked as a postdoctoral researcher in the group of G. A. Ozin at the University of Toronto. From 2009 to the beginning of 2017, she was an assistant professor at the Ludwig Maximilian University of Munich. From 2009 to the beginning of 2017, she was also an independent group leader Max Planck Institute for Solid State Research. In 2017, she became Director of the Max Planck Institute for Solid State Research and an honorary professor at the Ludwig Maximilian University of Munich.

Research 
Her research focuses on rational materials synthesis at the interface of solid-state chemistry, materials chemistry, and nanochemistry. Materials of her research interest are:

 New materials for energy conversion and storage (e.g., porous frameworks, lithium solid electrolytes for all-solid-state batteries)
 Photonic nanostructures for optical sensing
 2D nanosheet materials and artificial heterostructures

Selected publications

Awards 
Lotsch received several awards during her career:

 EU-40 Materials Prize, European Materials Research Society (EMRS), 2017 
 Young Elite - the Top 40 under 40 in Economy, Politics, and Society, 2015 and 2016 
 ERC Starting Grant, 2014
 Elected Fellow of the Royal Society of Chemistry (FRSC), 2014
 Fast Track Scholarship, Robert Bosch Foundation, 2008–2010
 E.ON Culture Prize, 2007
 Feodor Lynen Postdoc Scholarship (Alexander von Humboldt-Foundation), 2007
 Dissertation award (Stiftungspreis), LMU Munich, 2007
 PhD scholarship, German National Academic Foundation, 2004
 PhD scholarship, Fonds der Chemischen Industrie (FCI), 2003
 Faculty Prize (best diploma), 2002
 Herbert-Marcinek Prize (best preliminary diploma), 2000
 Scholarship, German National Academic Foundation, 1997
 Scholarship of the Stiftung Maximilianeum, 1997

References

External links
 

1977 births
21st-century German chemists
German women chemists
Living people
Fellows of the Royal Society of Chemistry
21st-century German women scientists
People from Frankenthal
Max Planck Institute directors